Wonder is a children's novel written by R. J. Palacio, published on February 14, 2012. Wonder was inspired by an incident where her son started to cry after noticing a girl with a severe facial deformity. Fearing her son would react badly, Palacio attempted to remove him from the situation so as not to upset the girl and her family but ended up worsening the situation. Natalie Merchant's song of the same name made her realize that the incident could illustrate a valuable lesson. Palacio was inspired by Merchant's lyrics and she began writing. She named the book directly after the song and used the song's chorus as the prologue of the first chapter.

Several spin-offs, including the calendar book 365 Days of Wonder: Mr. Browne's Book of Precepts, We're All Wonders, Auggie and Me, and White Bird have been published. A film adaptation was released in 2017, of which a spin-off sequel/prequel film (adapting White Bird) followed in 2022.

Plot
August "Auggie" Pullman is a 10-year-old living in North River Heights in Upper Manhattan. He has a genetic condition, Treacher Collins syndrome, which has left his face disfigured and required countless surgeries and special care. Due to his condition, August has been homeschooled by his mother for some years, however, wanting him to experience a larger world, his parents have enrolled him into Beecher Prep, a private school, for the start of fifth grade. Auggie has an older sister, Olivia "Via" Pullman, who is entering her first year of high school.

Before the start of the school year, Auggie's mother takes him to meet the principal, Mr. Tushman, who has invited three other students — Jack Will, Charlotte, and Julian — to take him on a tour of the school. Auggie is treated unkindly by Julian, who acts "like an angel" in front of adults. On his first day of school, Auggie tries in vain to avoid drawing attention to himself, but is subtly bullied by Julian and his friends. Auggie is approached and befriended at lunch by a classmate named Summer, and is paired in most of his classes with Jack, whom he also considers a friend.

However, on Halloween, Auggie, dressed as Ghostface, overhears Jack, who was expecting Auggie to dress up as Boba Fett, joining in with Julian and his friends making fun of him behind his back. Devastated, Auggie stays home sick for several days and isolates himself from his family, frustrating his sister Olivia, who begrudges Auggie the priority he receives over her. Returning to school, Auggie ignores Jack and confides the incident to Summer. Jack eventually presses Summer, who hints at the cause, and when Jack realizes how he behaved, he is ashamed, and recommits to his friendship with Auggie. This draws Julian's ire, and the two have a fight during which Jack punches Julian, leading Mr. Tushman to suspend him. Jack reconciles with Auggie, but becomes ostracized from many of his more popular classmates, as Julian's influence divides the students into factions over the conflict. Julian's mother writes Tushman to voice her concerns over Auggie attending the school, citing that his appearance may be too much of a burden for the other students to handle.

Via confides to her mother that she does not want Auggie to attend her school play, as she has enjoyed the fresh start her new school has given her, free of the burden of being associated with Auggie and his condition; Auggie overhears and angrily sulks in his room, but instead of his mother coming to comfort him as he had hoped, Via comes in instead to tell him their dog Daisy is dying, and urging him to come out and say goodbye before she is taken to the vet, which he does.

Meanwhile, Via's best friend Miranda has started avoiding her, for reasons unknown to Via. Both audition for the lead in their school play, but Miranda gets the part with Via as her understudy. However, on opening night, Miranda sees Via's entire family in the audience and feigns illness so that Via can take her place for the evening. It is revealed that Miranda, who has struggled to cope with her parents' divorce, felt isolated at summer camp and pretended Auggie was her brother, gaining sympathy and friendship from the other campers. Miranda changes her appearance and forms new friendships, but realized she misses Via, and after the show, the two reconcile. Via's family celebrates her performance by taking everyone out for dinner.

At the end of Auggie's school year, the fifth grade class goes on a three-day trip to a nature reserve. Auggie is initially concerned about going, but is relieved to hear Julian will not be attending, as he considers the trip "dorky". On the last night, Auggie and Jack are walking alone in the woods, when they are bullied and attacked by a group of older students from another school. Julian's friends happen by, and rush to the defense of their classmates, impressed by Auggie's boldness in standing up to the bullies. Auggie then becomes accepted by most of his class.
 
At graduation, August is awarded the 'Henry Ward Beecher Medal' for his exceptional strength and character throughout the school year, while Julian's parents decide to send him to a different school the following year. Auggie's mother proudly tells him that he is a 'wonder'.

Reception

Critical reception
The book received primarily positive reviews from professional critics. The parent resource Common Sense Media gave Wonder four out of five stars, calling it a "Moving, uplifting tale about a disfigured boy with inner beauty." Entertainment Weekly said: "In a wonder of a debut, Palacio has written a crackling page-turner filled with characters you can't help but root for." The New York Times called it, "Rich and memorable [...] It's Auggie and the rest of the children who are the real heart of Wonder, and Palacio captures the voices of girls and boys, fifth graders, and teenagers, with equal skill."

Critiques of the books by disability rights activists were more mixed. Disability activist Carly Findlay identified strongly with the story, saying, "As a reader with a visible difference, I will say that it's very well researched." Disfigured person Mike Moody, writing on the Disability in Kidlit blog, described the book as "an engaging, heart-rending story about disfigurement" but also discussed disappointment over the "missed opportunity" of the continued downplaying of the main character's disability and his persistent lack of agency. Ariel Henley, an author with a craniofacial condition, wrote an article in Teen Vogue on "What 'Wonder' Gets Wrong About Disfigurement and Craniofacial Disorders"; the article focuses on the casting of a non-disabled actor for the movie adaptation, but also discusses the plot of the work, arguing that "Auggie is used as a prop to teach those around him about acceptance and compassion."

Awards
Wonder was on The New York Times Best Seller list and was also on the Texas Bluebonnet Award master list. The book was the winner of the 2014 Maine Student Book Award, Vermont's Dorothy Canfield Fisher Children's Book Award, the 2015 Mark Twain Award, Hawaii's 2015 Nene Award, and the Junior Young Reader's Choice Award for 2015.  In Illinois, it won both the Bluestem and Caudill Awards in 2014.

Sales
The novel, written in English, has been translated into 29 other languages for worldwide sales: Spanish, Catalan, Japanese, German, French, Portuguese, Danish, Czech, Serbian, Arabic, Hebrew, Norwegian, Icelandic, Swedish, Faroese, Turkish, Dutch, Persian, Italian, Finnish, Russian, Korean, Chinese, Ukrainian, Polish, Croatian, Greek, Romanian, Vietnamese and Slovenian.

First published in 2012 by Alfred A. Knopf (now part of Penguin Random House), the novel was still a top seller for the firm when the film was released in 2017, when it sold 5 million copies in combined book and e-book units in the United States alone.

Film adaptations

A film adaptation directed by Stephen Chbosky and written by Steve Conrad starring Julia Roberts and Owen Wilson as Isabel and Nate Pullman respectively, and Jacob Tremblay as August Pullman was released on 17 November 2017 by Lionsgate.

Spinoff/prequel

A film adaptation directed by Marc Forster and written by Mark Bomback, starring Bryce Gheisar, Gillian Anderson, and Helen Mirren as Julian Albans, Vivienne, and Grandmère respectively. The film was supposed to be released on October 14, 2022, after being initially scheduled to release on September 16, 2022. In January 2023, it was announced that the film was scheduled to debut in a limited release on August 18, 2023, followed by a wide release on August 25, 2023.

Related books

Auggie & Me
Auggie & Me is a companion book to Wonder that contains "The Julian Chapter," which serves as a sequel to Wonder. It contains three stories, each telling the events of Wonder from different perspectives. The first story, called "The Julian Chapter," is told from the point of view of school bully Julian where he explains why he mistreats Auggie and if he will change. The second, called "Pluto," focuses on August Pullman's life before Beecher Prep and is told from the point of view of Christopher, Auggie's oldest friend. The third is called "Shingaling" and is told from the point of view of Auggie's classmate Charlotte, who, in Wonder, is the first person that is nice to him at Beecher Prep; it focuses on things that were going on between some of the girls in Auggie's year, such as Ximena Chin, Summer Dawson, and Maya Markowitz. Auggie finally adapted to his school with the help of his new friends.

Though originally published separately, the three stories were eventually grouped together and sold as one.

365 Days of Wonder
In Wonder, Mr. Browne made a precept for every month. 365 Days of Wonder states 365 different precepts collected by Mr. Browne. It also has thoughts and opinions by Mr. Browne after every month in the book.

We're All Wonders
In this short picture book, Auggie talks about his life before the book Wonder.  Auggie focuses on this story on how we are all wonders.  Auggie has his astronaut helmet on most of the time.

White Bird: A Wonder Story
In this 2019 graphic novel, Julian's Parisian grandmother tells him stories of her childhood as a young Jewish girl living in Nazi-occupied France during World War II, when she was hidden from the Nazis by a classmate and his family. The movie adaption is set to release October 14, 2022.

References

External links

 RJ Palacio's website
 Review in The Guardian
 http://www.islma.org/pdf/2014VotingTallies/2014-Bluestem-Book-Award-Voting-Results.pdf

American children's novels
Novels set in elementary and primary schools
American novels adapted into films
2012 American novels
2012 children's books
2012 debut novels
Mark Twain Awards
Alfred A. Knopf books